Chowdhury Sajjadul Karim was a Bangladeshi nuclear physicist and former advisor of the caretaker government led by Fakhruddin Ahmed. He was in charge of the Ministry of Agriculture, Ministry of Fisheries and Livestock, and Ministry of Environment and Forest.

Early life
Karim was born on 7 January 1948 at Mir Sharai, though his Home district is Feni, East Bengal, British Raj.

Career
He was a Bangladeshi nuclear physicist and chairman of the Bangladesh Atomic Energy Commission. He was also a former inspector of the International Atomic Energy Agency. He was an advisor of the caretaker government led by Fakhruddin Ahmed. He was in charge of Ministries of Agriculture, Fisheries and Livestock, and Environment and Forest.

Death
He died on 20 November 2015 in Bangladesh Medical College Hospital, Dhaka, Bangladesh.

References

1948 births
Advisors of Caretaker Government of Bangladesh
2015 deaths